The Wiesensteig witch trial took place in Wiesensteig in Germany in 1562–1563. It led to the execution of 67 women for sorcery. This has been described as the first of the great witch trials of Germany and the starting point of the continuing European witch hunt. The trial inspired to the popular book : Of the tricks of Demons, which were printed in six expanded editions in Latin between 1562 and 1583 and translated to French in 1565. It was recorded in 1563 in a pamphlet called "True and Horrifying Deeds of 63 Witches".

The trial 

In the mid-16th century, Wiesensteig suffered from religious turmoil, war, severe hail storms and epidemics. The ruler of the city, Count Ulrich von Helfenstein, started to blame the misfortunes of the city on witches.

On August 3, 1562, a severe hailstorm hit the city and the damages were extensive. Within a couple of days, Helfenstein had several women arrested and accused of witchcraft, an action which appears to have been met with approval. Six of the arrested women were executed as witches. They were made to confess to sorcery through torture. A number of these claimed to have seen citizens of Esslingen at their Sabbath. Three people were arrested in Esslingen, but later released.

Helfenstein was appalled at the lenience in Esslingen. He executed another forty-one women from Wiesensteig. On December 2, 1562, he approved the additional execution of 20 more. This amounted to the total reported in a sensational pamphlet of 1563, which described as: the true and terrible acts and deeds of the sixty-three witches and sorceresses who were burned at Wiesensteig.

There have been debates of the religious convictions of Ulrich von Helfensten in regards to the witch hunt: he was originally Catholic, a Lutheran during the trial and converted to Catholicism in 1567, which thereby also turned the religion of the city. Wiesensteig experienced more witch trials in 1583 (25 dead), 1605 (14 dead), 1611 (5 dead).

References

Further reading

External links 
 http://www.shanmonster.com/witch/hunters/helfenstein.html

Witch trials in Germany
1562 in law
1563 in law
1562 in the Holy Roman Empire
1563 in the Holy Roman Empire
Duchy of Württemberg